Wissam Zaki ( born 5 August 1986 in Iraq)  is an Iraqi former  professional footballer who last played for Al-Talaba.

Honours

Country 
 2005 West Asian Games Gold medallist.

External links
 Wissam Zaki on Goalzz

1986 births
Living people
Iraqi footballers
Al-Zawraa SC players
Al-Shorta SC players
Association football midfielders
Iraq international footballers